Liam Horner (26 June 1943 – 13 April 2003) was an Irish Olympic cyclist. He won the Tour of Ireland in 1972 and competed at the  Summer Olympics in 1968 and 1972.

References

External links
 

1943 births
2003 deaths
Irish male cyclists
Olympic cyclists of Ireland
Cyclists at the 1968 Summer Olympics
Cyclists at the 1972 Summer Olympics
Sportspeople from Dublin (city)